Tranhult is a small village a couple of miles south of Jönköping, Sweden. Tranhult has 7 farms with 15 inhabitants and a lot of animals.

One thing worth seeing in Tranhult is the huge Tranhultstenen, a stone on a cliff from the ice age. It's believed that the stone has been an old cult place.

Populated places in Jönköping County